Ballymeanoch (Scottish Gaelic: Baile Meadhonach - the middle settlement) is a complex of neolithic structures located in Kilmartin Glen, Scotland.

It includes an avenue of two rows of standing stones with 4 and 2 stones each, a stone circle, and a henge with a small burial cairn.  According to the Historic Environment Scotland marker at the site, the circle and standing stones are the older structures and their construction dates back to over 4000 years ago.  The tallest stone is 4 metres (12 feet) height.  The two middle stones of the four stone line are heavily carved with cup and ring marks. The complex is designated a scheduled ancient monument by Historic Environment Scotland.

The structures are located on a privately owned sheep farm but can be accessed via a series of paths that run between fences.  The site is adjacent to the Dunchraigaig cairn for which there is a car park along the road.

References

External links

 BBC site on Ballymeanoch and Dunchraigaig
 Kilmartin Historical site

Archaeological sites in Argyll and Bute
Historic Environment Scotland properties
Stone Age sites in Scotland
Scheduled Ancient Monuments in Argyll and Bute
Neolithic Scotland
Burials in Argyll and Bute
Henges